Gideon Blackburn (August 27, 1772 – August 23, 1838) was an American Presbyterian clergyman, evangelist, educator and missionary to Cherokee and Creek nations, and college president.  He raised funds for new colleges and founded numerous congregations and churches in areas of new western settlement in Tennessee and Kentucky.

Early life and education
Blackburn was born in Augusta County, Virginia, of Scots-Irish descent.  After being orphaned at the age of eleven, he moved to eastern Tennessee in 1787 to live with relatives. He worked at a sawmill and as a surveyor to obtain an education. As a youth he studied at Martin Academy in Washington County, Tennessee.  In 1792 he received his preacher's license and two years later was ordained by the Abingdon Presbytery of Virginia.

Career
In the 1790s Blackburn began his ministerial career as pastor at the New Providence Church, which he founded in Maryville, Tennessee.  He had established a farm and distillery near Fort Craig, Tennessee.  For the next two decades he mostly worked with congregations in Maryville, including Eusebia Presbyterian Church.  He was known as a powerful and evangelizing public speaker.

In the early 19th century, he raised funds to establish schools for Cherokee children.  He became a cultural missionary (1803–1809) to the Cherokee.  Receiving permission from them, he founded two schools for Cherokee boys in southeast Tennessee—one in 1804 on the Hiwassee River near Charleston, Bradley County, which future Cherokee Chief John Ross attended; and in 1806 one at the mouth of Sale Creek, Hamilton County.  Blackburn had all classes in English, with material on culture and practices of Anglo-American society.  Together the schools had an enrollment of about 100 students, mostly bicultural Cherokee-American boys, often sons of traders, who found the English lessons more useful.

Blackburn closed both schools in 1809 or 1810 after his reputation was severely damaged due to a scandal related to alcohol.  Some Creeks accused Blackburn, his brother Samuel, and the Cherokee chiefs John McIntosh and Major Ridge of scheming to ship whiskey illegally through Creek territory.  The Native American nations wanted to control the movement of whiskey and other liquor.

Moving to Middle Tennessee, a flourishing and fertile area being rapidly settled by migrants, Blackburn served as an itinerant preacher in Franklin, Tennessee, where he headed Harpeth Academy in 1811-13.  He founded five congregations in the area, including First Presbyterian Church of Nashville, Tennessee and in 1818 the first Presbyterian church in the Alabama Territory, at Huntsville.

Blackburn was elected a member of the American Antiquarian Society in 1815.

He then moved his family to Louisville, Kentucky, where he was pastor of the First Church of Louisville (1823–27).  He served as president and fundraiser for the young Centre College (1827–30).  He then served again as a minister, at Versailles, Kentucky (1830–33). During these years he also was active with the Kentucky Temperance Society.

Because of his success as a fundraiser, in 1833 Blackburn was invited to Carlinville, Illinois, where he helped raise funds for the new Illinois College. He also started work on developing a non-denominational seminary in Macoupin County.   In addition he founded two more congregations.

Four days short of his 66th birthday, he died there.  The Panic of 1837 had delayed fundraising for the new school he was trying to establish in Carlinville.  What was named Blackburn Seminary in his honor was opened in 1859.

Marriage and family
In 1793 Blackburn married a niece, Grizzel Blackburn, with whom he had seven daughters and four sons.

Legacy and honors
Blackburn established numerous new congregations and churches in Tennessee and Kentucky.  He was part of a movement to create community among new settlements of migrants from further East.

In 1859 Blackburn Theological Seminary, now Blackburn College, in Carlinville, Illinois was named after him.
Blackburn was a great-uncle to Kentucky Governor Luke P. Blackburn.

Citations

Further reading
 William McLoughlin, Cherokees and Missionaries (1984)
 Walter Posey, The Presbyterian Church in the Old Southwest (1952)
 V. M. Queener, "Gideon Blackburn", East Tennessee Historical Society Publications 6 (1934): 12-28.

1772 births
1838 deaths
People from Augusta County, Virginia
American people of Scotch-Irish descent
American Presbyterian ministers
American Presbyterian missionaries
Presbyterian missionaries in the United States
People from Macoupin County, Illinois
Presidents of Centre College
People from Maryville, Tennessee
Members of the American Antiquarian Society